Cedar Hill is an unincorporated community and census-designated place (CDP) in northwest Jefferson County, Missouri, United States. The population was 1,721 at the 2010 census.

History
A post office called Cedar Hill has been in operation since 1868. The community was named for cedar trees near the elevated town site.

Geography
Cedar Hill is located in northwestern Jefferson County at  (38.356193, -90.641681). Missouri Route 30, a four-lane highway, runs through the western side of the CDP, leading northeast into St. Louis and west  to St. Clair.

The Big River, a northward-flowing tributary of the Meramec River, forms the southern and western limits of the CDP, and the community is the site of an old mill and dam.

Demographics

As of the census of 2000, there were 1,703 people, 627 households, and 465 families residing in the CDP. The racial makeup of the CDP was 97.89% White, 0.06% African American, 0.82% Native American, 0.18% Asian, 0.35% from other races, and 0.70% from two or more races. Hispanic or Latino of any race were 0.82% of the population.

There were 627 households, out of which 38.8% had children under the age of 18 living with them, 56.5% were married couples living together, 11.5% had a female householder with no husband present, and 25.7% were non-families. 19.6% of all households were made up of individuals, and 7.0% had someone living alone who was 65 years of age or older. The average household size was 2.72 and the average family size was 3.11.

In the CDP, the population was spread out, with 27.2% under the age of 18, 9.9% from 18 to 24, 30.0% from 25 to 44, 24.7% from 45 to 64, and 8.2% who were 65 years of age or older. The median age was 35 years. For every 100 females, there were 97.1 males. For every 100 females age 18 and over, there were 95.1 males.

The median income for a household in the CDP was $35,481, and the median income for a family was $43,214. Males had a median income of $40,160 versus $21,074 for females. The per capita income for the CDP was $15,599. About 5.7% of families and 12.9% of the population were below the poverty line, including 6.1% of those under age 18 and 8.8% of those age 65 or over.

References

Census-designated places in Jefferson County, Missouri
Census-designated places in Missouri